Glaucocharis fusca is a moth in the family Crambidae. It was described by David E. Gaskin in 1974. It is found in the Solomon Islands.

References

Diptychophorini
Moths described in 1974